Daniel Verplancke (born 21 September 1948) is a Belgian racing cyclist. He rode in the 1974 Tour de France.

References

External links
 

1948 births
Living people
Belgian male cyclists
Place of birth missing (living people)